Franklin Township is an inactive township in Dent County, in the U.S. state of Missouri.

Franklin Township was established in 1866, taking its name from Benjamin Franklin.

References

Townships in Missouri
Townships in Dent County, Missouri